There are several human right activists in Nigeria.

This is a list of notable Nigerian human rights activists in a list.

References

Nigerian activists
Nigerian human rights